Greely Fiord is a natural inlet in the west of Ellesmere Island, Qikiqtaaluk Region,  Nunavut in the Arctic Archipelago. To the south lies the Cañon Fiord and the Agassiz Ice Cap. To the northwest is Borup Fiord and Tanquary Fiord is northeast.

References

External links
 Geologic map of Greely Fjord West (80 - 88°W 80 - 81°N)

Ellesmere Island
Fjords of Qikiqtaaluk Region